Thirunizhalmala ("Garland of the Sacred Shade" or "Grace") is a c. 13th century "pattu" genre poem in Malayalam language. Along with "Ramacharitham", it is one of the earliest extant poems in Malayalam. It is generally considered as a work associated with the Vaishnavite bhakti movement in south India. It is sometimes called "the first religious work in the Malayalam". "Thirunizhalmala" was discovered by scholar M. M. Purushothaman Nair in 1980.

"Thirunizhalmala" is composed, most probably by a high caste poet (from certain "Kurumur Palli"), in local meters and with Dravidian orthography. It is assumed that the work predates the famous "Ramacharitham" by around a century. The manuscript of the poem was discovered from northern Kerala. Central topic of the poem is the description of the ritual life of Aranmula Temple in Pathanamthitta. The main rites described are the ancient rituals of the Malayar or Malayan community (performed to remove the various impurities of the gods). It also describes the temple and its environs, the families of the temple-villages’ owners and the protecting soldiery. 

"Thirunizhalmala" is linked to the north Kerala art-form Theyyam and the community of its performers. The poem contains the earliest instance in Malayalam of the legend of Parasurama "founding" Kerala and the sixty-four settlements of Brahmins. It also mentions the medieval Tamil poet Kamban.

Modern editions of "Thirunizhalmala" are by M. M. Purushothaman Nair (1981 & 2016) and R. C. Karippath (2006)

References 

Malayalam-language literature
Bhakti movement